Mauro Gastón Martínez (born 27 February 1991) is an Argentine professional footballer who plays as a centre-back for Chaco For Ever.

Career
Martínez played for Talleres' academy. Between 2009 and 2011, Martínez made fifteen appearances for Évian. He returned to Argentina with Sportivo Belgrano in 2012, making his debut in a Torneo Federal A loss to San Martín in September. Martínez was loaned to Torneo Argentino B's Jorge Ross in 2013. On 8 March 2015, Martínez signed for Deportivo Roca. His first appearance arrived two weeks after versus Cipolletti, which was one of twenty-five matches that campaign. January 2016 saw Martínez complete a move to Alvarado. He scored his first career goals in September against Rivadavia and Ferro Carril Oeste.

In June 2018, Martínez joined Primera B Nacional side Chacarita Juniors. He subsequently made his bow against Almagro on 27 August. On 5 January 2019, having terminated his contract with Chacarita, Martínez was signed by Villa Dálmine. One goal in twenty-eight appearances followed. In July 2020, Martínez penned terms with Estudiantes. In January 2022, Martínez moved to Chaco For Ever.

Career statistics
.

References

External links

1991 births
Living people
People from Resistencia, Chaco
Argentine footballers
Association football defenders
Argentine expatriate footballers
Expatriate footballers in France
Argentine expatriate sportspeople in France
Torneo Argentino A players
Torneo Argentino B players
Torneo Federal A players
Primera Nacional players
Thonon Evian Grand Genève F.C. players
Sportivo Belgrano footballers
Deportivo Roca players
Club Atlético Alvarado players
Chacarita Juniors footballers
Villa Dálmine footballers
Estudiantes de Buenos Aires footballers
Sportspeople from Chaco Province